Konstantinos Petridis (born 1906, date of death unknown) was a Greek sprinter. He competed in the men's 100 metres at the 1928 Summer Olympics.

References

External links
 

1906 births
Year of death missing
Athletes (track and field) at the 1928 Summer Olympics
Greek male sprinters
Greek male long jumpers
Greek male triple jumpers
Olympic athletes of Greece
Place of birth missing
Sportspeople from Nicosia
20th-century Greek people